Citizen Effect is a Washington, D.C. based registered 501(c)(3) nonprofit that provides citizens with the tools they need to support a small-scale philanthropy project. Originally called 1Well, Citizen Effect was founded in 2008 and has completed 100 projects around the world.

Operations
Citizen Effect sponsors small-scale projects related to clean energy, education, food security, health, water and sanitation.  People interested in funding a project can browse current projects on Citizen Effect’s website and sign up. After choosing a project, people raise money from their social networks, receiving fundraising advice from Citizen Effect’s staff. When projects are fully funded, Citizen Effect and its field partners provide regular project updates.

History
Dan Morrison, Citizen Effect’s Founder and CEO, was working as a management consultant when he was invited to visit the Self-Employed Women's Association of India in 2008.  During his trip, he learned about the plight of Vachharajpur, a small village in Gujarat that lacked safe drinking water. Morrison raised $5,000 from his friends and family in the US to build a well in Vacharajpur, inspiring him to found an organization dedicated to connecting everyday citizens to at-risk communities across the world. Start-up money for Citizen Effect was provided by Google CEO Eric Schmidt.

References

External links
CitizenEffect.org is no longer owned by Citizen Effect.
 Official SEWA website

Charities based in Washington, D.C.
Organizations established in 2009